January Jackowiak (born 29 January 1982) is a former Australian cricketer who is a right-handed batter. During the early 2000s, she played 17 List A matches for South Australia in the Women's National Cricket League (WNCL).

References

External links
 
 

1982 births
Living people
Australian cricketers
Australian women cricketers
Cricketers from Adelaide
Sportswomen from South Australia
South Australian Scorpions cricketers